Yoshiro Hayashi may refer to:

, Japanese golfer
, Japanese politician